Michael Bitzer is an American/German ice hockey goaltender currently playing in the DEL2. He was an All-American for Bemidji State.

Playing career
After graduating from Moorhead High School, Bitzer played two seasons of junior hockey for the Lincoln Stars. He put up respectable if unspectacular numbers but was able to earn a scholarship to Bemidji State University. As soon as he debuted for the Beavers, Bitzer began to rewrite their record book. He finished 4th in the nation for goals against average as a freshman and was named as the WCHA Rookie of the Year, the only Beaver so honored. Both he and Bemidji State regressed slightly during his sophomore year but Bitzer rebounded in spectacular fashion as a junior. He posted some of the best goaltending numbers for the season and was named as a first team All-American. He led Bemidji State to a first-place finish in the WCHA and was named the league Player of the Year. Unfortunately, BSU lost in the conference semifinals and was left out of the NCAA Tournament.

After wrapping up his college career with a solid senior season, Bitzer signed with the Idaho Steelheads for the remainder of the 2018 season. That offseason, he signed with the Rapid City Rush but his tenure there proved to be short-lived. Bitzer did not perform well in his first full season as a pro and found himself relegated to being the team's third goaltender. On New Years Day, he was traded to the Atlanta Gladiators as a fulfilment of a previous trade. He improved a bit with his new surroundings but he was limited to just 9 games over the final three months of the season.

After the disappointing year, Bitzer travelled to Germany and spent two years with ETC Crimmitschau in the second German league. In October 2021, Bitzer signed a contract with the Wichita Thunder and was expecting to return to the ECHL. The arrangement ended up falling through, however, and Bitzer remained in Germany. He ended up signing with Selber Wölfe, who had just received a promotion to DEL2 from the Oberliga.

Career statistics

Awards and honors

References

External links

1993 births
Living people
American men's ice hockey goaltenders
German ice hockey goaltenders
Ice hockey players from Minnesota
People from Moorhead, Minnesota
AHCA Division I men's ice hockey All-Americans
Bemidji State Beavers men's ice hockey players
Idaho Steelheads (ECHL) players
Rapid City Rush players
Atlanta Gladiators players
ETC Crimmitschau players